The Cockfields is a British television sitcom created by Joe Wilkinson and David Earl, and produced by Yellow Door Productions for Gold. It aired over two series from 12 November 2019 until 12 November 2021, including a Christmas special, for a total of 10 episodes. 
Set on the Isle of Wight, it stars Wilkinson as Simon and Diane Morgan as his girlfriend Donna. The show begins with Simon and Donna returning to Simons home to visit his family as part of their engagement. Sue Johnston plays Simon's mother Sue, Bobby Ball as his stepfather Ray, and Ben Rufus Green as his stepbrother David. The cast also includes Nigel Havers as Larry (Simon's father), and Sarah Parish as Melissa (Larry's girlfriend).

Series 2 commenced with Simon again visiting the Isle of Wight, this time with new fiancée Esther (Susannah Fielding). Gregor Fisher takes over the role of Ray, following the death of Bobby Ball in October 2020.

A Christmas special was broadcast on 13 December 2021.

Cast and characters 
 Joe Wilkinson as Simon
 Diane Morgan as Donna (series 1)
 Susannah Fielding as Esther (series 2)
 Sue Johnston as Sue
 Bobby Ball as Ray (series 1)
 Gregor Fisher as Ray (series 2)
 Ben Rufus Green as David
 Jeff Mirza as Andre (series 1)
 Nigel Havers as Larry
 Sarah Parish as Melissa

Episodes

Series 1 (2019)

Series 2 (2021)

References

External links 

2019 British television series debuts
2021 British television series endings
2010s British sitcoms
2020s British sitcoms
English-language television shows
Gold (British TV channel) original programming
Isle of Wight
Television series about couples
Television series about dysfunctional families